Inderpal Grewal is a professor of Women's, Gender and Sexuality Studies at Yale University, and a key figure in the academic discipline of women's studies.  She is an influential feminist scholar whose research interests include transnational and postcolonial feminist theory; feminism and human rights; nongovernmental organizations and theories of civil society and citizenship; law and subjectivity; travel and mobility and South Asian cultural studies. Together with Caren Kaplan, Grewal is best known for her work as a founder of the field of transnational feminist cultural studies or transnational feminism.  She has served on the Editorial and Advisory Boards of core journals in the field of feminist cultural studies, Women's Studies Quarterly; Jouvert: Journal of Postcolonial Studies and Meridians: feminisms, race, transnationalism. She is also one of three series editors for the New Wave in Women's Studies book series published by Duke University Press., and blogs about gender issues for the Huffington Post.

Before her appointment at Yale, she taught at the University of California at Irvine and at San Francisco State University.

Prof. Grewal has a Ph.D in English from the University of California at Berkeley and an M.A. from Punjab University. She was the valedictorian of her high school class at St. Agnes' School in Howrah, West Bengal, India.

Recent publications 
 Inderpal Grewal, Transnational America: Feminisms, Diasporas, Neoliberalisms. Durham: Duke University Press, 2005
 Caren Kaplan and Inderpal Grewal, An Introduction to Women's Studies: Gender in a Transnational World,  McGraw-Hill Humanities/Social Sciences/Languages, September 25, 2001 (Second edition 2005)
 Inderpal Grewal, Home and Harem: Nation, Gender, Empire and the Culture of Travel. Durham: Duke University Press, 1997)
 Caren Kaplan and Inderpal Grewal, Scattered Hegemonies: Postmodernity and Transnational Feminist Practices, (Univ of Minnesota Press, 1994)

Notes

Videos of Inderpal Grewal 
2007 Keynote address at the Duke Feminist Theory Workshop
Inderpal Grewal on a feminist panel on transnational feminism and terrorism
Inderpal Grewal on a panel: "Liberalism and its others"
2011 Lecture at UCLA
Soli Sorabjee Lecture in South Asian Studies at Brandeis University in 2013

External links 
Yale University Faculty Webpage
 Inderpal Grewal's blog for the Huffington Post
 "Where are India's missing girls?" an Op-ED by Inderpal Grewal
Inderpal Grewal papers - Pembroke Center, Brown University

Yale University faculty
Living people
Women's studies academics
Year of birth missing (living people)